Woodhouse College is a single site selective state sixth form centre situated between North Finchley and Friern Barnet on the eastern side of the London Borough of Barnet in North London, England. It is one of the most successful sixth form colleges in England and is a member of The Maple Group. It was formerly a state grammar school, known as Woodhouse Grammar School.

Admissions
The college caters mainly for full-time students aged 16 to 18 whose primary aim is to progress to Higher Education. Entrance grade criteria are similar to other high-performing sixth forms in Barnet.

History

Woodhouse Grammar School
After the First World War, the former residence of ornamental plasterer Thomas Collins (1735–1830) in the Woodhouse area of Finchley was reconstructed; the house became The Woodhouse School in 1923. A blue plaque commemorating Thomas Collins is on the wall outside the present college office. The school coat of arms with the motto 'Cheerfulness with Industry' is still displayed above the stage in the college hall.

During the Second World War, the school continued to function while the basement was used by the ARP service. The names of the forty-seven former pupils who died during WWII are recorded in a hand-illuminated Roll of Honour which hangs at the foot of the main staircase near the front entrance to the college. The Roll of Honour also records the names of the four houses of the old grammar school: Gordon, Livingstone, Nightingale and Scott.

Sixth Form
Woodhouse Grammar School was later reconstituted as Woodhouse Sixth Form College. There were plans to merge the school with Friern Barnet County Secondary School in 1971, but these were blocked by local MP Margaret Thatcher. Thatcher gave a speech at the college in May 1983.

In January 2021 Woodhouse College converted to academy status and is now part of the Frontier Learning Trust.

Academic performance
The college achieves above average A-level results. Woodhouse College's 2022 results were 83%  grades A* - B.

Notable alumni

Woodhouse Grammar School
 Cyril Fletcher, comedian famous for his "odd odes"
 Giles Hart, British engineer and trade union activist
 Ian Bedford, cricketer 
 John Somerville, sculptor
 Oliver Postgate, English animator and creator of Bagpuss 
 Paul Davies, astrophysicist
 Robert G. W. Anderson, Director of the British Museum
 Jagdip Jagpal, director of India Art Fair

Woodhouse Sixth Form College
 Daisy Edgar-Jones, actress
 Johann Hari, British journalist and writer 
 Julia Hartley-Brewer, British journalist, broadcaster and presenter 
 Naomie Harris, actress
 David Hirsh, sociologist
 Jesse Honey, BBC Mastermind winner 2010 and World Quiz Champion 2012
 Michael McIntyre, stand-up comedian
 Ali Jawad, Paralympic Powerlifter (Silver Medallist, Rio 2016)
 Robert Rinder, Judge Rinder, barrister
Stephen Bush, Journalist

References

External links
 Woodhouse College
 EduBase

Academies in the London Borough of Barnet
Learning and Skills Beacons
Education in the London Borough of Barnet
Friern Barnet